The hermeneutics of suspicion is a style of literary interpretation in which texts are read with skepticism in order to expose their purported repressed or hidden meanings.

This mode of interpretation was conceptualized by Paul Ricœur, inspired by the works of what he called the three "masters of suspicion": Karl Marx, Sigmund Freud, and Friedrich Nietzsche, who, he believed, shared a similar view of consciousness as false. Ricœur's term "school of suspicion" refers to his association of his theory with the writings of the three, who themselves never used this term, and was coined in Freud and Philosophy (1965). This school is defined by a belief that the straightforward appearances of texts are deceptive or self-deceptive and that explicit content hides deeper meanings or implications.

Overview
Hans-Georg Gadamer, in his 1960 magnum opus Truth and Method (German: Wahrheit und Methode), offers perhaps the most systematic survey of hermeneutics in the 20th century. The title of the work indicates his dialogue between claims of "truth" on the one hand and the processes of "method" on the other—in brief, the hermeneutics of faith and the hermeneutics of suspicion. Gadamer suggests that, ultimately, one must decide between one and the other when reading.

Ruthellen Josselson similarly writes, "Ricoeur distinguishes between two forms of hermeneutics: a hermeneutics of faith which aims to restore meaning to a text and a hermeneutics of suspicion which attempts to decode meanings that are disguised."

According to literary theorist Rita Felski, hermeneutics of suspicion is "a distinctively modern style of interpretation that circumvents obvious or self-evident meanings in order to draw out less visible and less flattering truths." Felski further writes:

Felski also notes that the "'hermeneutics of suspicion' is the name usually bestowed on [a] technique of reading texts against the grain and between the lines, of cataloging their omissions and laying bare their contradictions, of rubbing in what they fail to know and cannot represent." In that sense, it can be seen as being related to ideology critique. Felski has built on Ricœur's theory in outlining her influential theory of postcritique.

See also
 Critical theory
 Michel Foucault
 Sheldon Pollock
 Freudo-Marxism
 Post-structuralism

References

1970s neologisms
Hermeneutics
Literary criticism
Continental philosophy